Tanaji Sakharamji Mutkule is a member of the 13th Maharashtra Legislative Assembly. He represents the Hingoli Assembly Constituency. He belongs to the Bharatiya Janata Party (BJP).

Career
He has been a member of the Hingoli Zilla Parishad, representing the BJP. He has been credited with building strengthening BJP's organisation between 2005-2009. In 2009, he had contested the Hingoli assembly seat unsuccessfully as a BJP candidate, losing to Bhaurao Baburao Patil of the Indian National Congress. In May, 2014, he had contested elections for Hingoli (Lok Sabha constituency) as an independent candidate, but lost to Rajeev Satav of the Indian National Congress. Mutkule has been BJP Hingoli district president. In 2019 election contest he won and became MLA .

References

Maharashtra MLAs 2014–2019
Bharatiya Janata Party politicians from Maharashtra
Living people
People from Hingoli
Maharashtra district councillors
People from Hingoli district
Marathi politicians
Year of birth missing (living people)
In 2019 election contest he won and became MLA .